The first edition of the European television game show Jeux sans frontières was held in 1965. The participant countries of the games were Belgium, France, Italy and West Germany. The winners of this edition were the cities of Ciney and Saint-Amand-les-Eaux.

Participating countries and cities

Heat 1

Heat 2

Heat 3

Heat 4

Heat 5

Heat 6

Semi-Final 1

Semi-Final 2

International Final

References

Jeux sans frontières
Television game shows with incorrect disambiguation